The AWM-SIAM Sonia Kovalevsky Lecture is an award and lecture series that "highlights significant contributions of women to applied or computational mathematics." The Association for Women in Mathematics (AWM) and the Society for Industrial and Applied Mathematics (SIAM) created the award and lecture series in 2002; the lecture is normally given each year at the SIAM Annual Meeting. Award winners receive a signed certificate from the AWM and SIAM presidents.

The lectures are named after Sonia Kovalevsky (1850–1891), a well-known Russian mathematician of the late 19th century. Karl Weierstrass regarded Kovalevsky as his most talented student.  In 1874, she received her Doctor of Philosophy degree from the University of Göttingen under the supervision of Weierstrass. She was granted privatdozentin status and taught at the University of Stockholm in 1883; she became an ordinary professor (the equivalent of full professor) at this institution in 1889. She was also an editor of the journal Acta Mathematica.  Kovalevsky did her  important work in the theory of partial differential equations and the rotation of a solid around a fixed point.

Recipients
The Kovalevky Lecturers have been:

 2003   Linda R. Petzold, University of California, Santa Barbara, “Towards the Multiscale Simulation of Biochemical Networks”
 2004   Joyce R. McLaughlin, Rensselaer Polytechnic Institute, “Interior Elastodynamics Inverse Problems: Creating Shear Wave Speed Images of Tissue”
 2005   Ingrid Daubechies, Princeton University, “Superfast and (Super)sparse Algorithms”
 2006   Irene Fonseca, Carnegie Mellon University, “New Challenges in the Calculus of Variations”
 2007   Lai-Sang Young, Courant Institute, “Shear-Induced Chaos”
 2008   Dianne P. O'Leary, University of Maryland, “A Noisy Adiabatic Theorem: Wilkinson Meets Schrödinger’s Cat”
 2009   Andrea Bertozzi, University of California, Los Angeles
 2010   Suzanne Lenhart, University of Tennessee at Knoxville, “Mixing it up: Discrete and Continuous Optimal Control for Biological Models”
 2011   Susanne C. Brenner, Louisiana State University, “A Cautionary Tale in Numerical PDEs”
 2012   Barbara Keyfitz, Ohio State University, “The Role of Characteristics in Conservation Laws”
 2013   Margaret Cheney, Colorado State University, “Introduction to Radar Imaging”
 2014   Irene M. Gamba, University of Texas at Austin, “The evolution of complex interactions in non-linear kinetic systems”
 2015   Linda J. S. Allen, Texas Tech University, “Predicting Population Extinction”
 2016   Lisa J. Fauci, Tulane University, “Biofluids of Reproduction: Oscillators, Viscoelastic Networks and Sticky Situations”
 2017   Liliana Borcea, University of Michigan, “Mitigating Uncertainty in Inverse Wave Scattering”
 2018   Eva Tardos, Cornell University, “Learning and Efficiency of Outcomes in Games”
 2019   Catherine Sulem, University of Toronto, “The Dynamics of Ocean Waves”
 2020   Bonnie Berger, MIT, “Compressive genomics: leveraging the geometry of biological data”
2021   Vivette Girault, Université Pierre et Marie Curie, "From linear poroelasticity to nonlinear implicit elastic and related models" 
2022   Anne Greenbaum, University of Washington, "Two of my Favorite Problems”

See also

 List of mathematics awards

References

External links 

Kovalevsky
Awards of the Society for Industrial and Applied Mathematics
Awards and prizes of the Association for Women in Mathematics
2003 establishments in the United States